"Hurricane" is a song by Lauren Bennett. The song was released on May 2, 2016.

Background
Bennett's second solo single "Hurricane" was released on May 2, 2016 via Interscope Records.

In an Instagram post on May 8, 2016, Bennett explained her inspiration for the single, saying "After G.R.L. ended I had no idea what was going to happen next, everything fell apart pretty fast. That's when this song was written. After seeing my mother suffer with mental struggles for years I then lost a friend to this. It has always effected my life in someway. We all at least know someone who has dealt with it or have yourself. This is a story to show from my eyes what it feels like to suffer from this but also the other perspective to lose someone to this." It was later announced on Twitter that a portion of the proceeds from the single would be donated to The Campaign to Change Direction, an organization dedicated to change the culture of mental health in America.

Release history

References

2016 singles
2016 songs
Geffen Records singles
Interscope Records singles